Orient Baptist Church, also known as First Baptist Church of Laurelton, is a historic Baptist church on New Jersey Route 88 in the Laurelton section of Brick Township in Ocean County, New Jersey, United States.

The Greek Revival building was constructed in 1858 and added to the National Register of Historic Places in 1977.

References

External links
Church website

Baptist churches in New Jersey
Brick Township, New Jersey
Churches on the National Register of Historic Places in New Jersey
Churches completed in 1858
19th-century Baptist churches in the United States
Churches in Ocean County, New Jersey
National Register of Historic Places in Ocean County, New Jersey
New Jersey Register of Historic Places